Cheilosia  praecox is a Palearctic hoverfly. Speight et al.
(1998) indicate that the correct name for this species is C.urbana (Meigen)

Description
Very similar to Cheilosia psilophthalma and related species. For differences see references

Distribution and biology
From Fennoscandia south to the Iberian peninsula and the Mediterranean basin and from Britain eastwards through central and southern Europe to the Balkans and Turkey, and in North Africa.
. 
The habitat is open places in both coniferous and deciduous forest and scrub;  grassland, including montane/subalpine grassland. Flowers visited include white umbellifers, Acer pseudoplatanus, Anemone nemorosa, Buxus, Caltha, Euphorbia, Potentilla, Prunus spinosa, Salix, Taraxacum. Flies in April to June later at higher altitudes and more northerly latitudes. The larva feeds on Hieracium pilosella and Hieracium caespitosum.

References

External links
 Images representing Cheilosia praecox (as urbana)

Diptera of Europe
Eristalinae
Insects described in 1843